Michael Appleby may refer to:

Michael C. Appleby, animal welfare specialist
Michael Appleby (politician), New Zealand politician
Michael Appleby (rugby league), Australian rugby league player